Wigan Athletic Football Club is a professional football team based in Wigan, Greater Manchester. They currently compete in the Sky Bet Championship.

The following is a list of notable footballers who have played for Wigan Athletic F.C. All players who have made 100 or more first-team appearances for the club are listed below. There are also players with fewer appearances listed who are holders of a club record, or winners of the club's Player of the Year award.

Statistics correct as of 30 June 2022

Notes

References
 
 
 

Wigan Athletic F.C.
Association football player non-biographical articles